Air Chief Marshal Fali Homi Major, PVSM, AVSM, SC, VM, ADC served as the 21st Chief of the Air Staff of the Indian Air Force, taking office on 1 April 2007, and becoming the first helicopter pilot in the service to be promoted to the office of Chief. He retired on 31 May 2009, and was succeeded in office by Air Chief Marshal P V Naik.

Air Force Career
Major was commissioned into the Indian Air Force on 31 December 1967 as a helicopter pilot. During his long and distinguished service spanning little over 39 years, he worked in a variety of Command, Staff and Instructional appointments. Besides being a Fellow of the National Defence College, New Delhi, and the Army War College, Mhow, he attended a variety of courses like Junior Commanders' Course, Jungle and Snow Survival Course and Higher Command Courses. He was appointed Joint Director (Helicopter Operations) and Director Operations (Transport & Helicopter). In 1999, Major took over as the Air Officer Commanding Leh (Ladakh), in the aftermath of the Kargil conflict.

Credits and awards
Major has the distinction of having 7,765 hours flying experience. For his leadership, successful accomplishment of tasks and distinguished service of a very high order, he was awarded the ‘Ati Vishist Seva Medal’ in Jan 2002. Major was promoted to the rank of Air Vice Marshal in Feb 2002 and appointed as Assistant Chief of the Air Staff (Personnel Airmen & Civilians) at Air Headquarters. On promotion to the rank of Air Marshal in Jan 2004 Major moved to HQ Integrated Defence Staff as the Deputy Chief of Integrated Defence Staff (Operations) and directed the relief, rescue and rehabilitation operations of the Indian Armed Forces, in India and abroad, in the aftermath of the Tsunami. On 5 September 2005, he was appointed as the Air Officer Commanding-in-Chief, Eastern Air Command. That tenure saw the successful conduct of three major international air exercises with the United States Air Force, Republic of Singapore Air Force and the French Air Force. Major was awarded the ‘Param Vishisht Seva Medal’ by the President of India on 26 Jan 2006.

Major commanded a helicopter unit, which took part in operations in Siachen, the world's highest battlefield and commanded a Mi-17 squadron during the IPKF operations in Sri Lanka, for which he was decorated with the Vayu Sena Medal (Gallantry).

While serving as a Group Captain, Major was awarded Shaurya Chakra for undertaking a very dangerous and exacting rescue mission on 14 October 1992 at Timber Trail in Parwanoo, Himachal Pradesh, where he along with his crew, winched eleven stranded tourists out from a cable car, by hovering precariously close to the set of cables that ran above it.

Career after the Air Force
Major served as an Independent Director of Air India. He was also a member of the National Security Advisory Board to the Government of India. Major has served as an Independent Director at Reliance Defence and Engineering Limited since 2016.

Personal life
Major was born on 29 May 1947 in Secunderabad, Nizam's Dominion. He is an alumnus of Wesley High School, Secunderabad. Air Chief Marshal F H Major is married to Mrs Zareen Major and has one son (Zubin Major) and one daughter (Tooshna Major). Major belongs to Parsi community and is an avid golfer and a cricket fan.

References

1947 births
Living people
People from Secunderabad
Chiefs of Air Staff (India)
Indian Air Force air marshals
Parsi people
Recipients of the Param Vishisht Seva Medal
Indian Air Force officers
Military personnel from Hyderabad, India
National Defence College, India alumni
Recipients of the Ati Vishisht Seva Medal
Recipients of the Shaurya Chakra
Recipients of the Vayu Sena Medal
Army War College, Mhow alumni